The surgeon general of the Navy (SGN) is the most senior commissioned officer of the Medical Corps of the United States Navy and is the principal advisor to the United States Secretary of the Navy, Chief of Naval Operations and director of the Defense Health Agency on all health and medical matters pertaining to the United States Navy and United States Marine Corps. As head of the Bureau of Medicine and Surgery, the surgeon general also manages Navy and Marine healthcare policy, administering the services' healthcare and biomedical research facilities as well as the various staff corps of BUMED, including the Medical Corps and an enlisted corps. The surgeon general is also a member of the Office of the Chief of Naval Operations.

From 1965 to 2019, the surgeon general was appointed as a three-star vice admiral, until the National Defense Authorization Act for Fiscal Year 2017 struck the surgeon general's statutory rank. The present surgeon general, Rear Admiral Bruce L. Gillingham became the first two-star admiral to hold the office in over 54 years. One version of the National Defense Authorization Act for Fiscal Year 2023 considered advancing the surgeon general's rank back to vice admiral. However, the final version of the bill did not include reinstating the statutory rank. Currently, the surgeon general of the Navy is the only surgeon general of a uniformed service to not hold a three-star rank.

Establishment of the Bureau of Medicine and Surgery

On 31 August 1842, the United States Congress passed a Navy appropriation bill that was a blueprint for efficiency. The legislation provided for five Navy bureaus United States Navy bureau system to replace the outdated Board of Navy Commissioners—Yards and Docks; Construction, Equipment, and Repair; Provisions and Clothing; Ordnance and Hydrography; and Medicine and Surgery. Heading each of the bureaus was a "Chief" to be appointed by the President of the United States.

The Bureau of Medicine and Surgery (BUMED) became the central administrative headquarters for the Navy Medical Department, and those names became interchangeable. The general order of 26 November 1842, which defined the duties of the new bureaus, charged BUMED with:

 All medicines and medical stores of every description, used in the treatment of the sick, the diseased and the wounded;
 All boxes, vials, and other vessels containing the same;
 All clothing, beds, and bedding for the sick;
 All surgical instruments of every kind;
 The management of hospitals, so far as the patients therein are concerned;
 All appliances of every sort, used in surgical and medical practice;
 All contracts, accounts, and returns, relating to these and such other subjects as shall hereafter be assigned to this bureau.

Overseeing all of these duties, and directing the medical department, was the Chief of BUMED, William P. C. Barton. Barton served at this post until 1844. He was followed by Thomas Harris, William Whelan, Phineas Horwitz, and William Maxwell Wood. Since the days of Barton's directorship the most senior ranking physician in the Navy Medical Department has held the title of Chief of the Bureau of Medicine and Surgery.

Creation of the title
On 3 March 1871, Congress passed legislation granting medical and other staff officers of the Navy "relative rank" with grades "equal to but not identical with the grades of the line."  This Naval Appropriations Act went further than any previous Congressional action in transforming and enhancing the Navy Medical Department. The Chief of the Bureau of Medicine and Surgery now had the additional title "Surgeon General," with the relative rank of Commodore. At the helm of this "revitalized" organization stood the first Surgeon General, William Maxwell Wood (1809–1880), a man entering his 42nd year of a naval service as unusual and varied as could be. Wood had served aboard , one of the first steam vessels of the Navy, and designated flagship during the "expedition for the suppression of Indian hostilities on the coast of Florida" (a.k.a. the Seminole Wars). Wood served shore duty at Sackets Harbor, New York, Baltimore, Maryland, had duty as Fleet Surgeon of the Pacific Fleet, and served under Commodore John D. Sloat in California during the Mexican–American War. However fitting he may have been as the first Navy Surgeon General, he served less than two years.

Chief of Bureau of Medicine and Surgery

List of Chiefs of BUMED and Surgeons General of the Navy

See also
 Surgeon General of the United States
 Surgeon General of the United States Army
 Surgeon General of the United States Air Force

References

Further reading
 Bureau of Medicine and Surgery, "The United States Navy Medical Department at War, 1941–1945." Washington, 1946. 757 pp.; describe the operational role of naval medical units ashore and afloat partly online
 A History of Medicine in the Early U.S. Navy, Harold D. Langley Johns Hopkins University Press, 2000
 The History of the Medical Department of the United States Navy in World War II (Washington: Government Printing Office, 1953) online

External links

 Navy Bureau of Medicine and Surgery
Early Civil War Treatise on Gunshot Wounds By Surgeon General P.J. Horwitz Shapell Manuscript Foundation

Surgeon
Medicine in the United States Navy
1869 establishments in the United States